Cross Island Chapel is a non-denominational church located on a dock on Mason's Pond in Oneida, New York.

Description 
The church, erected in 1989, is notable for its small size, measuring just four feet three inches by six feet nine inches and has been called "The Smallest Church in the World".

References 

Churches in Madison County, New York
Churches completed in 1989